The Hupmobile Touring – E was a vehicle produced by the Hupp Motor Company.

See also
 Hupmobile

References
Source: 

Cars of the United States
Hupmobile